The racial policy of Nazi Germany was a set of policies and laws implemented in Nazi Germany under the dictatorship of Adolf Hitler, based on a specific racist doctrine asserting the superiority of the Aryan race, which claimed scientific legitimacy. This was combined with a eugenics programme that aimed for racial hygiene by compulsory sterilization and extermination of those who they saw as Untermenschen ("sub-humans"), which culminated in the Holocaust.

Nazi policies labeled centuries-long residents in German territory who were not ethnic Germans such as Jews (understood in Nazi racial theory as a "Semitic" people of Levantine origins), Roma (also known as Gypsies, an "Indo-Aryan" people of Indian subcontinent origins), along with the vast majority of Slavs (mainly ethnic Poles, Serbs, Russians etc.), and most non-Europeans as inferior non-Aryan subhumans (i.e. non-Nordics, under the Nazi appropriation of the term "Aryan") in a racial hierarchy that placed the Herrenvolk ("master race") of the Volksgemeinschaft ("people's community") at the top.

The racial policy of the Nazi Party and the German state was organized through the Office of Racial Policy, which published circulars and directives to relevant administrative organs, newspapers, and educational institutes.

Historical origins of Nazi racial theories and policies
Adolf Hitler himself along with other members of the Nazi Party in the Weimar Republic (1918–1933) were greatly influenced by several 19th- and early 20th-century thinkers and proponents of philosophical, onto-epistemic, and theoretical perspectives on ecological anthropology, scientific racism, holistic science, and organicism regarding the constitution of complex systems and the theorization of organic-racial societies. In particular, one of the most significant ideological influences on the Nazis was the 19th-century German nationalist philosopher Johann Gottlieb Fichte, whose works had served as an inspiration to Hitler and other Nazi Party members, and whose ideas were implemented among the philosophical and ideological foundations of Nazi-oriented Völkisch nationalism.

Basis of Nazi policies and the constitution of the Aryan Master Race

The Aryan Master Race conceived by Adolf Hitler and the other Nazis graded humans on a scale of pure Aryans to non-Aryans (who were viewed as subhumans). At the top of the scale of pure Aryans were Germans and other Germanic and Northern European peoples, including the Dutch, Scandinavians, and the English. Latins were held to be somewhat inferior, but were tolerated; and the French were thought to have a suitable admixture of Germanic blood.

The feeling that Germans were the Aryan Herrenvolk (Aryan master race) was widely spread among the German public through Nazi propaganda and among Nazi officials throughout the ranks, in particular when the Reichskommissar of Ukraine Erich Koch said:

The Nazis considered the Slavs as Non-Aryan Untermenschen ("sub-humans") who were to be enslaved and exterminated by Germans. Slavic nations such as the Ukrainians, Czechs, Slovaks, Bulgarians and Croats who collaborated with Nazi Germany were still being perceived as not racially "pure" enough to reach the status of Germanic peoples, yet they were eventually considered ethnically better than the rest of the Slavs, mostly due to pseudoscientific theories about these nations having a considerable admixture of Germanic blood. In countries where these people lived, there were according to Nazis small groups of non-Slavic German descendants. These people underwent a "racial selection" process to determine whether or not they were "racially valuable", if the individual passed they would be re-Germanised and forcefully taken from their families in order to be raised as Germans. This secret plan Generalplan Ost ("Master Plan East") aimed at expulsion, enslavement and extermination of most Slavic people. Nazi policy towards them changed during World War II as a pragmatic means to resolve military manpower shortages: they were allowed, with certain restrictions, to serve in the Waffen-SS, in spite of being considered subhumans. Nazi propaganda portrayed people in Eastern Europe with an Asiatic appearance to be the result of intermingling between the native Slavic populations and Asiatic or Mongolian races as sub-humans dominated by the Jews with the help of Bolshevism. At the bottom of the racial scale of non-Aryans were Jews, ethnic Poles, ethnic Serbs and other Slavic people, Romani, and black people. The Nazis originally sought to rid the German state of Jews and Romani by means of deportation (and later extermination), while blacks were to be segregated and eventually eliminated through compulsory sterilization.

Volkisch theorists believed that Germany's Teutonic ancestors had spread out from Germany throughout Europe. Of the Germanic tribes that spread through Europe, the theorists identified that the Burgundians, Franks, and Western Goths joined with the Gauls to make France; the Lombards moved south and joined with the Italians; the Jutes made Denmark; the Angles and Saxons made England; the Flemings made Belgium; and other tribes made the Netherlands.

Nazi racial beliefs of the superiority of an Aryan master race arose from earlier proponents of a supremacist conception of race such as the French novelist and diplomat Arthur de Gobineau, who published a four-volume work titled An Essay on the Inequality of the Human Races (translated into German in 1897). Gobineau proposed that the Aryan race was superior, and urged the preservation of its cultural and racial purity. Gobineau later came to use and reserve the term Aryan only for the "German race" and described the Aryans as 'la race germanique'. By doing so he presented a racist theory in which Aryans–that is Germans–were all that was positive. Houston Stewart Chamberlain's work The Foundations of the Nineteenth Century (1900), one of the first to combine Social Darwinism with antisemitism, describes history as a struggle for survival between the Germanic peoples and the Jews, whom he characterized as an inferior and dangerous group. The two-volume book Foundations of Human Hereditary Teaching and Racial Hygiene (1920–21) by Eugen Fischer, Erwin Baur, and Fritz Lenz, used pseudoscientific studies to conclude that the Germans were superior to the Jews intellectually and physically, and recommended eugenics as a solution. Madison Grant's work The Passing of the Great Race (1916) advocated Nordicism and proposed using a eugenic program to preserve the Nordic race. After reading the book, Hitler called it "my Bible".

Racist author and Nordic supremacist Hans F. K. Günther, who influenced Nazi ideology, wrote in his "Race Lore of German People" (Rassenkunde des deutschen Volkes) about the danger of "Slavic blood of Eastern race" mixing with the German and combined virulent nationalism with Antisemitism. Günther became an epitome of corrupt and politicized pseudo-science in post-war Germany. Among the topics of his research were attempts to prove that Jews had an unpleasant "hereditary smell". While one of the most prominent Nazi writers, Günther still was not considered the most "cutting edge" by Nazis.

The July 1933 Law for the Prevention of Hereditarily Diseased Offspring – written by Ernst Rüdin and other theorists of "racial hygiene" – established "Genetic Health Courts" which decided on compulsory sterilization of "any person suffering from a hereditary disease." These included, for the Nazis, those suffering from "Congenital Mental Deficiency", schizophrenia, "Manic-Depressive Insanity", "Hereditary Epilepsy", "Hereditary Chorea" (Huntington's), Hereditary Blindness, Hereditary Deafness, "any severe hereditary deformity", as well as "any person suffering from severe alcoholism". Further modifications of the law enforced sterilization of the "Rhineland bastards" (children of mixed German and African parentage).

The Nazi Party wanted to increase birthrates of those who were classified as racially elite. When the Party gained power in 1933, one of their first actions was to pass the Law for the Encouragement of Marriage. This law stated that all newly married couples of the Aryan race could receive a government loan. This loan was not simply paid back, rather a portion of it would be forgiven after the birth of each child. The purpose of this law was very clear and simple: to encourage newlyweds to have as many children as they could, so that the Aryan population would grow.

Racial policies regarding the Jews, 1933–1939

Approximately 525,000 Jews were living in Germany in 1933 (0.75% of the entire German population). Discrimination against Jews began immediately after the national seizure of power in 1933. The Nazi Party used populist antisemitic views to gain votes. Using the "stab-in-the-back legend", they blamed poverty, the hyperinflation in the Weimar Republic, unemployment, and the loss of World War I and surrender by the "November Criminals" all on the Jews and "cultural Bolsheviks", the latter considered to be in a conspiracy with the Jews. German woes were attributed to the effects of the Treaty of Versailles. In 1933, persecution of the Jews became active Nazi policy. This was at first hindered by the lack of agreement on who qualified as a Jew as opposed to an Aryan; this caused legislators to balk at an antisemitic law for its ill-defined terms. Bernhard Lösener described it as "total chaos", with local authorities regarding anything from full Jewish background to  Jewish blood as defining a Jew; Achim Gercke urged  Jewish blood. Those of mixed descent (Mischlinge) were especially problematic in their eyes. The first antisemitic law was promulgated with no clear definition of a Jew. Finally, the criterion was set at three or four Jewish grandparents; two or one rendered a person a Mischling.

On April 1, 1933, the Nazi boycott of Jewish businesses was observed throughout Germany. Only six days later, the Law for the Restoration of the Professional Civil Service was passed, banning Jews from government jobs. It is notable that the proponents of this law, and the several thousand more that were to follow, most frequently explained them as necessary to prevent the infiltration of damaging, "alien-type" (Artfremd) hereditary traits into the German national or racial community (Volksgemeinschaft). These laws meant that Jews were now indirectly and directly dissuaded or banned from privileged and superior positions reserved for "Aryan Germans". From then on, Jews were forced to work in more menial positions, becoming second-class citizens or to the point that they were "illegally residing" in Nazi Germany.

In the early years of Nazi rule, there were efforts to secure the elimination of Jews by expulsion; later, a more explicit commitment was made to extermination. On August 25, 1933, the Nazis signed the Haavara Agreement with Zionists to allow German Jews to emigrate to Palestine in exchange for a portion of their economic assets. The agreement offered a way to leave an increasingly hostile environment in Nazi Germany; by 1939, 60,000 German Jews (about 10% of the Jewish population) had emigrated there. Thereafter, Nazi policy eventually changed to one of total extermination. Nazi doctrine culminated in the Holocaust, or so-called "Final Solution", which was made official at the January 1942 Wannsee Conference.

Nuremberg Laws

Between 1935 and 1936, persecution of the Jews increased apace while the process of "Gleichschaltung" (lit.: "standardisation", the process by which the Nazis achieved complete control over German society) was implemented. In May 1935, Jews were forbidden to join the Wehrmacht (the armed forces), and in the summer of the same year, anti-semitic propaganda appeared in shops and restaurants. The Nuremberg Laws were passed around the time of the great Nazi rallies at Nuremberg; on September 15, 1935, the "Law for the Protection of German Blood and Honor" was passed. At first this criminalised sexual relations and marriage only between Germans and Jews, but later the law was extended to "Gypsies, Negroes and their bastard offspring"; it became punishable by law as Rassenschande or racial pollution. After this, the "Reich Citizenship Law" was passed, and was reinforced in November by a decree; it included only people of "German or related blood", which meant that all Jews were stripped of their citizenship and their official title became "subjects of the state". This meant that they were deprived of basic citizens' rights, e.g. the right to vote. This removal of citizens' rights was instrumental in the process of anti-semitic persecution: the process of denaturalization allowed the Nazis to exclude—de jure—Jews from the "Volksgemeinschaft" ("national community"), thus granting judicial legitimacy to their persecution and opening the way to harsher laws and, eventually, extermination of the Jews. Philosopher Hannah Arendt pointed out this important judicial aspect of the Holocaust in The Origins of Totalitarianism (1951), where she demonstrated that to violate human rights, Nazi Germany first deprived human beings of their citizenship. Arendt underlined that in the Declaration of the Rights of Man and of the Citizen, citizens' rights actually preceded human rights, as the latter needed the protection of a determinate state to be actually respected.

The drafting of the Nuremberg Laws has often been attributed to Hans Globke. Globke co-authored several aspects of the laws, such as the ordinance which legally required Jews with non-Jewish names to take on the additional first names Israel or Sara, along with the official legal commentary on the Reich Citizenship Law.

In 1936, Jews were banned from all professional jobs, effectively preventing them from having any influence in education, politics, higher education, and industry. There was now nothing to stop the anti-Jewish actions that spread across the German economy.

Between 1937 and 1938, new laws were implemented, and the segregation of Jews from the "German Aryan" population was completed. In particular, Jews were punished financially for being Jewish.

From March 1, 1938, government contracts could not be awarded to Jewish businesses. On September 30, "Aryan" doctors could only treat "Aryan" patients. Provision of medical care to Jews was already hampered because Jews were banned from being doctors.

On August 17, Jews with first names of non-Jewish origin were legally required to add "Israel" (males) or "Sara" (females) to their names, and a large letter "J" was to be printed on their passports on October 5. On November 15, Jewish children were banned from going to state-run schools. By April 1939, nearly all Jewish companies had either collapsed under financial pressure and declining profits, or been persuaded to sell out to the government, further reducing their rights as human beings; they were, in many ways, effectively separated from the German populace.

The increasingly totalitarian regime that Hitler imposed on Germany allowed him to control the actions of the military. On November 7, 1938, a young Polish Jew named Herschel Grynszpan attacked and shot German diplomat Ernst vom Rath in the German embassy in Paris. Grynszpan's family, together with more than 12,000 Polish-born Jews, had been expelled by the Nazi government from Germany to Poland in the so-called "Polenaktion" on October 28, 1938. Joseph Goebbels ordered retaliation. On the night of November 9, the SS and SA conducted "the Night of Broken Glass" ("Kristallnacht"), in which at least 91 Jews were killed and a further 30,000 arrested and incarcerated in Nazi concentration camps. After the start of the war, and the conquest of numerous European countries, the Jewish population was put into ghettos, from which they were shipped to death camps where they were murdered.

Jewish responses to the Nuremberg Laws

After the promulgation of the Nuremberg Laws, the Reichsvertretung der Deutschen Juden (Representation of the German Jews) announced the following:

Sinti and Roma

Nazi Germany began persecution of the Romani as early as 1936 when they began to transfer the people to municipal internment camps on the outskirts of cities, a prelude to the deportation of 23,000 Gypsies to concentration camps.  "Pure-blooded" Gypsies were considered by the Nazis to be Aryan. Roughly ten percent of Gypsies were considered to be racially pure.

Heinrich Himmler suggested creating a "Gypsy Law" to separate Gypsies from the German people:

However, although many laws during Nazi Germany persecuted the Gypsies, a specific "Gypsy Law", although talked about often, was never enacted by the Nazis.

Afro-Germans

In Mein Kampf, Hitler described children resulting from marriages to African occupation soldiers as a contamination of the Aryan race "by Negro blood on the Rhine in the heart of Europe." He thought that "Jews were responsible for bringing Negroes into the Rhineland, with the ultimate idea of bastardizing the white race which they hate and thus lowering its cultural and political level so that the Jew might dominate." He also implied that this was a plot on the part of the French, saying the population of France was being increasingly "negrified".

The number of black people in Germany when the Nazis came to power is variously estimated at 5,000 to 25,000. According to the United States Holocaust Memorial Museum, Washington, D.C., "The fate of black people from 1933 to 1945 in Nazi Germany and in German-occupied territories ranged from isolation to persecution, sterilization, medical experimentation, incarceration, brutality, and murder. However, there was no systematic program for their elimination as there was for Jews and other groups."

Prior to Hitler coming to power, black entertainers were popular in Germany, but the Nazis banned jazz as "corrupt negro music".

Of particular concern to the Nazi scientist Eugen Fischer were the "Rhineland Bastards": mixed-race offspring of Senegalese soldiers who had been stationed in the Rhineland as part of the French army of occupation. He believed that these people should be sterilized in order to protect the racial purity of the German population. At least 400 mixed-race children were forcibly sterilized in the Rhineland by 1938. This order only applied in the Rhineland. Other African Germans were unaffected. Despite this policy, there was never any systematic attempt to eliminate the black population in Germany, though some blacks were used in medical experiments, and others mysteriously disappeared.

According to Susan Samples, the Nazis went to great lengths to conceal their sterilization and abortion program in the Rhineland. Hans Massaquoi describes his experience as a half-African in Hamburg, unaware of the Rhineland sterilizations until long after the war. Samples also points to the paradoxical fact that African-Germans actually had a better chance of surviving the war than the average German. They were excluded from military activity because of their non-Aryan status, but were not considered a threat and so were unlikely to be incarcerated. Samples and Massaquoi also note that African-Germans were not subjected to the segregation they would have experienced in the United States, nor excluded from facilities such as expensive hotels. However, they both state that downed black American pilots were more likely to become victims of violence and murder from German citizens than white pilots.

Policies regarding Poles, Russians and other Slavs

As early as 1925, Hitler suggested in Mein Kampf that the German people needed Lebensraum ("living space") to achieve German expansion eastwards (Drang nach Osten) at the expense of the "inferior Slavs". Hitler believed that "the organization of a Russian state formation was not the result of the political abilities of the Slavs in Russia, but only a wonderful example of the state-forming efficacity of the German element in an inferior race."

After the invasion of the Soviet Union, Hitler expressed his future plans for the Slavs:

Nazi ideology viewed the Slavic peoples as non-Aryan  Untermenschen ("sub-humans"), who were targeted for enslavement, expulsion and extermination. The racial status of Slavs during the Third Reich was inconsistent over time. Hitler viewed the Slavs as "a mass of born slaves who feel the need of a master". Nazi propaganda portrayed the Germanic peoples as "heroes" in contrast to the Jewish and Slavic "sub-humans". Nazi propaganda depicted Eastern Europe as racially mixed "Asiatic" that was dominated by the Jews with the aid of Bolshevism. The Nazis considered some people in Eastern Europe to be suitable for Germanization (they were presumed to be of German descent); if they were considered racially valuable they were to be re-Germanized and forcefully taken from their families to Germany and raised as Germans.

The final version of Generalplan Ost, essentially a grand plan for ethnic cleansing, was divided into two parts: the Kleine Planung ("Small Plan"), which covered actions which were to be taken during the war, and the Grosse Planung ("Big Plan"), which covered actions to be undertaken after the war was won (to be carried into effect gradually over a period of 25–30 years). The Small Plan was to be put into practice as the Germans conquered the areas to the east of their pre-war borders. The individual stages of this plan would then be worked out in greater detail. In this way, the plan for Poland was drawn up at the end of November 1939.

The plan envisaged removal of the majority of the population of conquered counties, with very small and varied percentages of the various conquered nations undergoing Germanisation, expulsion into the depths of Russia, and other fates, the net effect of which would be to ensure that the conquered territories would be Germanized. Himmler declared during the Germanization process that no drop of German blood would be lost or left behind to mingle with any "alien races". The Wehrbauer ("soldier-peasants") would settle in a fortified line to prevent civilization arising beyond and threatening Germany. 
 
The Nazis issued the Polish decrees on 8 March 1940 which regulated the working and living conditions of Polish laborers (Zivilarbeiter) used during World War II in Germany. The decrees set out that any Pole "who has sexual relations with a German man or woman, or approaches them in any other improper manner, will be punished by death." The Gestapo were extremely vigilant about sexual relations between Germans and Poles and pursued any case relentlessly where this was suspected. There were similar regulations used against the other ethnic groups brought in from Eastern Europe, including the death penalty for sexual relations with a German person. During the war, hundreds of Polish and Russian men were executed for their relations with German women.

Heinrich Himmler, in his secret memorandum "Reflections on the Treatment of Peoples of Alien Races in the East" dated 25 May 1940, expressed his own thoughts and the future plans for the populations in the East. Himmler stated that it was in the German interest to discover as many ethnic groups in the East and splinter them as much as possible, find and select racially valuable children to be sent to Germany to assimilate them and restrict non-Germans in the General Government and conquered territories to four-grade elementary school which would only teach them how to write their own name, to count up to 500 and to obey Germans. Himmler believed the Germanization process in Eastern Europe would be complete when "in the East dwell only men with truly German, Germanic blood".

Other "non-Aryans"

Though the laws primarily targeted Jews, other "non-Aryan" people were subject to the laws, and to other legislation concerned with racial hygiene. The term "Aryan" was never fully defined - it was too imprecise and ambiguous; a number of judicial and executive decisions made attempts over time to clarify the concept. Jews were by definition non-Aryan, because of their Semitic origins. Outside of Europe in North Africa, according to Alfred Rosenberg's racial theories (The Myth of the Twentieth Century), some of the Berbers, particularly the Kabyles, were to be classified as Aryans. The Nazis portrayed Swedes, the Afrikaners – who are white European descendants of Dutch-speaking Boers in South Africa – and higher-degree Northern/Western Europeans of South America (mainly from Uruguay, Brazil and Argentina) as ideal "Aryans" along with the German-speaking peoples of Greater Germany and Switzerland (the country was neutral during the war). The Roma (Gypsies), who, while considered originally Aryan, were deemed a threat to the Aryan race because of their racial mingling.

Turks and Turkics

The Crimean Karaites, Turkic speakers following Karaite Judaism, managed to get a declaration from the Reich Agency for the Investigation of Families that they were not to be considered of Jewish religion and their racial classification should be done individually.
However, not every Nazi officer or soldier were aware of the official position and a small number Karaites were murdered by German troops in Russia, as if they were Jews.
The majority of the Karaites fared much better than the Turkic-speaking Jews, the Krymchaks.

In 1935, with the passages of the Nuremberg Laws, Turks were recognized to be 'racially related to Finns and Hungarians' and considered 'Aryan' as per NSDAP directive. This rule applied to Turkic peoples and Turkish citizens. The April 30, 1936 NSDAP Office for Racial Policy circular reads: "The Turks are Aryans" while explaining that Turkish citizens of Jewish background would still be considered Jews. However, the Turkish government's policy of not discriminating on the basis of the ethnic origins or racial background of citizens meant that Turkish Jews in German occupied Europe who could produce Turkish citizenship papers enjoyed the status of Turk and could escape Europe to Turkey unharmed. In addition, Turkish students and diplomats moved freely in Germany and enjoyed the legal status of Aryans. The racial policy of classifying Turks as Aryans was extended to all Turkish speaking peoples in Central Asia, and the Turkic and Altaic peoples as a whole. The Germans regarded all Ural-Altaic peoples to be Aryan.

Norwegians
In Norway, the Nazis favored and promoted children between Germans and Norwegians, in an attempt to raise the birth rate of Nordic Aryans. Around 10,000–12,000 war children (Krigsbarn) were born from these unions during the war. Some of them were separated from their mothers and cared for in so-called "Lebensborn" clinics ("Fountain of Life" clinics).

Finno-Ugrics
The Finns had a debatable position in the Nazi racial policies, as they were considered a part of the "Eastern Mongol race" with the Sámi people in traditional racial hierarchies. Finland did not have Lebensborn centres, unlike Norway, although Finland had tens of thousands of German soldiers in the country. Archival research however has found out that 26 Finnish women were in contact with the Lebensborn program for unspecified reasons.

In 1941 Nazi Germany established the Reichskommissariat Ostland to administer the conquered territories of the Baltic region. The colonial department in Berlin under Minister Alfred Rosenberg (born in Tallinn in 1893) looked on Estonians favorably as Finno-Ugrics and thus as "Aryans", Generalkommissar Karl-Siegmund Litzmann authorized a Landeseigene Verwaltung, or local national administration. As Germany invaded the Soviet Union in June 1941, Finland participated in the invasion primarily to recover the territories it was forced to cede to the USSR after the Moscow Peace Treaty which ended the Winter War between the Finns and the Soviets. Owing to Finland's substantial military contribution on the northern flank of the Eastern Front of World War II, Hitler decreed in November 1942 that "from now on Finland and the Finnish people be treated and designated as a Nordic state and a Nordic people", which he considered one of the highest compliments that the Nazi government could bestow upon another country. Hitler stated in private conversation that:
After their first conflict with the Russians, the Finns applied to me, proposing that their country should become a German protectorate. I don't regret having rejected this offer. As a matter of fact, the heroic attitude of this people, which has spent a hundred of the six hundred years of its history in fighting, deserves the greatest respect. It is infinitely better to have this people of heroes as allies than to incorporate it in the Germanic Reich—which, in any case, would not fail to provoke complications in the long run. The Finns cover one of our flanks, Turkey covers the other. That's an ideal solution for me as far as our political protective system is concerned.

Han Chinese and Japanese

Despite having a separate evolutionary origin from the Europeans, the Han Chinese and Japanese were both considered by Adolf Hitler and the government of Nazi Germany to be "Aryans of the East" and the "Herrenvolk of the Orient" (i.e. the "Master race of the Orient").

In 1945, Adolf Hitler said:

"Pride in one's own race, and that does not imply contempt for other races, is also a normal and healthy sentiment. I have never regarded the Chinese or the Japanese as being inferior to ourselves. They belong to ancient civilizations, and I admit freely that their past history is superior to our own. They have the right to be proud of their past, just as we have the right to be proud of the civilization to which we belong. Indeed, I believe the more steadfast the Chinese and the Japanese remain in their pride of race, the easier I shall find it to get on with them."--Adolf Hitler, The Political Testament of Adolf Hitler, Note #5, February 1945 - April 1945

Due to Nazi Germany's recognition of Han Chinese and Japanese as "Aryans of the East" Adolf Hitler had allowed Han Chinese and Japanese soldiers to study in Nazi German military academies and serve in the Nazi German Wehrmacht as part of their combat training. Since 1926, Germany had supported the Republic of China militarily and industrially. Germany had also sent advisers such as Alexander von Falkenhausen and Hans von Seeckt to assist the Chinese, most notably in the Chinese Civil War and China's anti-communist campaigns. Max Bauer was sent to China and served as one of Chiang Kai-shek's advisers. Around this time, Hsiang-hsi Kung, the Republic of China (Taiwan) Minister of Finance, visited Nazi Germany and was warmly welcomed by Adolf Hitler on June 13, 1937. During this meeting, 
Adolf Hitler, Hermann Göring and Hjalmar Schacht bestowed upon Hsiang-hsi Kung an honorary doctorate degree, and attempted to open China's market to German exports. And in order to attract more Han Chinese students to study in Germany, Adolf Hitler, Hermann Göring and Hjalmar Schacht earmarked for 100,000 reichsmarks for Han Chinese students studying in the universities and military academies of Nazi Germany after they persuaded a German industrialist to set aside the money for that purpose. Additionally, Hsiang-hsi Kung, in favor of commercial credits, politely refused a generous international loan offer by Adolf Hitler. The most famous of these Han Chinese Nazi soldiers was Chiang Wei-kuo, the son of Republic of China (Taiwan) President Chiang Kai-shek, who studied military strategy and tactics at a Kriegsschule in Munich, and subsequently achieved the rank of lieutenant and served as a Nazi soldier in the Wehrmacht on active combat duty in Europe until his return to the Republic of China (Taiwan) during the later years of World War II.

Adolf Hitler had supported the Empire of Japan as early as 1904, when during the Russo-Japanese War it had defeated the Russians, which he considered a defeat for Austrian Slavism. He made a number of other statements expressing his respect and admiration for the Japanese in his book Mein Kampf.

Although of a separate and different evolutionary race, the Han Chinese and Imperial Japanese were considered by Nazi ideologists such as Himmler as having sufficiently superior qualities as did German-Nordic blood to warrant an alliance. Himmler, who possessed a great interest in, and was influenced by, the anthropology, philosophies and pantheistic religions of East Asia, mentioned how his friend Hiroshi Ōshima, the Japanese Ambassador to Germany, believed that the noble castes in Japan, the Daimyō and the Samurai, were descended from gods of celestial origin, which was similar to Himmler's own belief that "the Nordic race did not evolve, but came directly down from heaven to settle on the Atlantic continent."

Karl Haushofer, a German general, geographer, and geopolitician, whose ideas may have influenced the development of Hitler's expansionist strategies, saw Japan as the brother nation to Germany. In 1908, he was sent by the German Army "to Tokyo to study the Japanese Army and to advise it as an artillery instructor. The assignment changed the course of his life and marked the beginning of his love affair with the orient. During the next four years he traveled extensively in East Asia, adding Korean, Japanese, and Mandarin to his repertoire of Russian, French, and English languages. Karl Haushofer had been a devout student of Schopenhauer, and during his stay in the Far East he was introduced to Oriental esoteric teachings." It was based on such teachings that he came to make similar bestowals of his own upon the Japanese people, calling them the "Aryans of the East", and even the "Herrenvolk of the Orient" (i.e. the "Master race of the Orient").

Initially, the Japanese were still subject to Germany's racial laws, which – with the exception of the 1935 Nuremberg Laws that specifically mentioned Jews – generally applied to all "non-Aryans". However, since Japanese and Chinese were given "Aryans of the East" status, these racial laws were applied to them in a lenient manner as compared to other "non-Aryans" who were not granted "Aryan" status by Adolf Hitler. The Nazi German government began enacting the laws after taking power in 1933, and the Japanese government initially protested several racial incidents involving Japanese or Japanese-Germans that year which were then resolved by the Nazi high command by treating their Japanese allies leniently in these disputes. Especially after the collapse of Sino-German cooperation and Chinese declaration of war on Germany, Chinese nationals faced prosecution in Germany. Influential Nazi anti-Semite Johann von Leers favored excluding Japanese from the laws due both to the alleged Japanese-Aryan racial link and to improve diplomatic relations with Japan. The Foreign Ministry agreed with von Leers and sought several times between 1934 and 1937 to change the laws, but other government agencies, including the Racial Policy Office, opposed the change.

Then in October 1933, German Foreign Minister Konstantin von Neurath issued an exemption to Han Chinese and Japanese from the racial laws. Additionally, in April 1935 another Nazi decree stated that racial discrimination cases involving Aryans of the East (aka. Han Chinese and Japanese) that might jeopardize German diplomatic relations—i.e., Japanese—would be dealt with individually. Decisions on some cases sometimes took years, with those affected unable to obtain jobs or interracially marry, primarily because the German government preferred as much as possible to avoid giving exemptions. The German government often exempted more German-Japanese than it preferred in order to avoid a repeat of the 1933 controversies, and in 1934 it prohibited the German press from discussing the race laws when Japanese and Han Chinese were involved to avoid any diplomatic problems with China or Japan.

Germanization between 1939 and 1945

Nazi policy stressed the superiority of the Nordic race, a sub-race of the white European population defined by the measurement of the size and proportions of the human body models of racial difference. From 1940 the Nazi authorities in the General Government (occupied Poland) divided the population into different groups. Each group had different rights, food rations, allowed strips in the cities, separated residential areas, special schooling systems, public transportation and restricted restaurants. Later adapted in all Nazi-occupied countries by 1942, the Germanization program used the racial caste system of reserving certain rights to one group and barred privileges to another. Ethnic Poles were believed by Hitler to be "biologically inferior race" that could never be educated or elevated through Germanization. In 1940, Hitler approved of a plan regarding the Germanization of the Protectorate of Bohemia and Moravia, he estimated around half of the Czech population were suitable for Germanization but made clear that the "mongoloid" types and Czech intelligentsia were not allowed to be Germanized.

During the occupation of Poland, the Nazi government kidnapped children with Nordic racial characteristics. Those classified as "racially valuable" were sent from to the German Reich to be adopted and raised as Germans, while those who failed the tests would be used in slave labor or murdered in medical experiments.

Nordicist anthropometrics was used to "improve" the racial make-up of the Germanized section of the population, by absorbing individuals into the German population who were deemed suitably Nordic.

Germanization also affected the Sorbs, the minority Slav community living in Saxony and Brandenburg, whose Slavic culture and language was suppressed to absorb them into German identity. Tens of thousands suffered internment and imprisonment as well, to become lesser-known victims of Nazi racial laws. Similarly, the Nazis considered the people living in the Goralenvolk area to be descended from ethnic Germans and were therefore classified as Aryans.

See also

Ahnenerbe
Anti-Jewish legislation in prewar Nazi Germany
Anti-Romani sentiment
Antisemitism
Antisemitism in Europe
Antisemitism in 21st century Germany
Anti-Slavic sentiment
Aryan certificate
Aryan paragraph
Aryanization
Badge of shame
Consequences of German Nazism
Eugenics
Greater Germanic Reich
Honorary Aryan
Kaiser Wilhelm Institute of Anthropology, Human Heredity, and Eugenics
Kaiser Wilhelm Society
Master race
Josef Mengele
Nationalsozialistischer Reichsbund für Leibesübungen
Nazi eugenics
Nazi racial theories
Nordicism
Office of Racial Policy
Porajmos
Racial hierarchy
Racial discrimination
Racial segregation
Racism
Racism in Europe
Racism in Germany
White nationalism
White supremacy
Yellow badge

References
Notes

Bibliography

Further reading

Aly, Götz, Susanne Heim. Architects of Annihilation: Auschwitz and the Logic of Destruction, London, Weidenfeld & Nicolson, 2002, 514pp, 
Bauer, Yehuda. A History Of The Holocaust, New York: F. Watts, 1982 .
Browning, Christopher. The Origins of the Final Solution: The Evolution of Nazi Jewish Policy, University of Nebraska Press, 2004, 616pp, 
Friedländer, Saul. Nazi Germany and the Jews. Vol. 1: The Years of Persecution, 1933–1939, New York : HarperCollins, 1997 
König, Malte. Racism within the Axis: Sexual Intercourse and Marriage Plans between Italians and Germans, 1940–3, in: Journal of Contemporary History 54.3, 2019, pp. 508–526.
Peukert, Detlev. Inside Nazi Germany: conformity, opposition and racism in everyday life London: Batsford, 1987 .
Proctor, Robert. Racial Hygiene: Medicine under the Nazis. Cambridge, MA: Harvard University Press, 1988. 
Schafft, Gretchen E. From Racism to Genocide: Anthropology in the Third Reich. Urbana and Chicago: University of Illinois Press, 2004.
Weindling, Paul. Health, Race and German Politics between National Unification and Nazism, 1870–1945. Cambridge University Press, 1989.

External links
Nazi Racial Laws in English translation
Nazi Racial Laws in the German original

1930s in politics
1940s in politics
Anti-Slavic sentiment
Anti-Polish sentiment in Europe
Anti-Serbian sentiment
Antiziganism in Europe
Historical definitions of race
Jewish Austrian history
Jewish Nazi German history
Law in Nazi Germany
Nazi eugenics
Germanization

es:Política racial de la Alemania Nazi
fr:Politiques racistes du Troisième Reich